Joseph Jean-Baptiste Laurent Arban (28 February 1825 – 8 April 1889) was a cornetist, conductor, composer, pedagogue and the first famed virtuoso of the cornet à piston or valved cornet. He was influenced by Niccolò Paganini's virtuosic technique on the violin and successfully proved that the cornet was a true solo instrument by developing virtuoso technique on the instrument.

Life
Arban was born in Lyon, France, one of ten children of Simon Arban, artificier. An older brother was the balloonist Francisque Arban.

He studied trumpet with François Dauverné at the Paris Conservatoire from 1841 to 1845. After graduating from the Conservatory with honors, Arban began to master the cornet. He was appointed professor of saxhorn at the École Militaire in 1857, and became professor of cornet at the Conservatoire in 1869, where Merri Franquin was among his students. In 1864, he published his influential Grande méthode complète pour cornet à pistons et de saxhorn. In 1876, at the invitation of Alexander II, Arban conducted some concerts in Pavlovsk.

Arban apparently made a phonograph cylinder recording for the Edison Company shortly before his death. In the Finnish newspaper Hufvudstadsbladet (no. 96, of 11 April 1890, page 2), Arban's recording is mentioned:

Among the phonograms a particular one must be mentioned: solo on cornet à piston, played by the famous French virtuoso monsieur Arban called "Fanfare d'Edison".

Arban died in Paris.

The Arban Method
Arban's cornet method of 1864 is often referred to as the "Trumpeter's Bible". It is still studied by modern brass players.  The Arban Method book is available by various publishers, with Carl Fischer and Alphonse Leduc being the most prominent. In 1982 Carl Fischer released a version that is annotated by Claude Gordon, noted pedagogue. The 1982 Carl Fischer version restores the original text and designates the previous revisions by Walter Smith and Edwin Franko Goldman. Then, Claude Gordon makes comments in the footnotes for clarification and cross referencing supporting material. Arban's original text did not advocate many things that are purported by recent teachers and this edition is useful for historical accuracy.

His variations on The Carnival of Venice remains one of the great showpieces for cornet soloists today. "Fantasie Brilliante" also continues to be frequently performed and recorded.

External links

Short biography
Longer article on O. J.'s Trumpet Page

1825 births
1889 deaths
19th-century classical composers
19th-century conductors (music)
19th-century French composers
Conservatoire de Paris alumni
French classical musicians
French conductors (music)
French cornetists
French male classical composers
French male conductors (music)
French Romantic composers
Musicians from Lyon